Tsagaandelger (White expansive) is a sum (district) of Dundgovi Province in central Mongolia. In 2007, its population was 1,319.

References 

Districts of Dundgovi Province